The second season of Yu-Gi-Oh! 5D's (with the title Earthbound Immortals for the English dub) runs from episodes 27 to 64. The story revolves around the battle between the united Signers, and the evil Dark Signers.

Episode list

References

2008 Japanese television seasons
2009 Japanese television seasons
5D's (season 2)